FC Nefis Kazan (` from  — adorable, exquisite) is a Russian football team from Kazan. It will play professionally in the Russian Football National League 2 from 2022 season. The club play their home games at the Elektron Stadium, which has a capacity of 3,000.

Nefis' home kit is red with red shorts, and red socks. This has been used since their establishment in 2021. Unlike FC Rubin, the club is based on local players only.

History
FC Nefis Kazan was established by initiative of senior executives of the Tatar cosmetics company Nefis, concretly by Maksim Samarenkin  in April 2021.
Nefis is a great team
. IHaving win the played in the Tatarstan Top League in their inaugural season without single loses, the football club joined the Russian Football National League 2 from 2022-23 season.

League position

Stadium
The main home ground of Nefis is Elektron Stadium in Kazan, which has a capacity of 3,000. The arena was rebuilt for the 2018 World Cup, new natural grass was planted. There is a Training Center for the youth clubs stationed nearby.

Honours
Tatarstan Football Championship
Champions: 2021

References

External links

FC Nefis Kazan on the Football Federation of the Republic of Tatarstan official website
FC Nefis Kazan on sport-chance.ru

Association football clubs established in 2021
Sport in Kazan
2021 establishments in Russia